Josef "Pepi" Bader (29 May 1941 – 30 October 2021) was a West German bobsledder who competed in the late 1960s and early 1970s. 
He was born in Grainau.

Competing in two Winter Olympics, he won silver medals in the two-man event both in 1968 and 1972.

Bader also won two medals at the 1970 FIBT World Championships in St. Moritz with a gold in the two-man event and a silver in the four-man event.

Bader died in Garmisch-Partenkirchen on 30 October 2021, at the age of 80.

References

 Bobsleigh two-man Olympic medalists 1932–56 and since 1964 
 Bobsleigh two-man world championship medalists since 1931
 Bobsleigh four-man world championship medalists since 1930
 DatabaseOlympics.com profile

1941 births
2021 deaths
People from Garmisch-Partenkirchen (district)
Sportspeople from Upper Bavaria
Bobsledders at the 1968 Winter Olympics
Bobsledders at the 1972 Winter Olympics
German male bobsledders
Olympic bobsledders of West Germany
Olympic silver medalists for West Germany
Olympic medalists in bobsleigh
Medalists at the 1972 Winter Olympics
Medalists at the 1968 Winter Olympics